SS Clan Alpine was a UK steam cargo liner. She was launched in 1918 and sunk by a U-boat in 1943.

Clan Alpine spent her entire career with Clan Line. She was the third of five Clan Line ships to be called Clan Alpine.

Details
The Greenock and Grangemouth Dockyard Co Ltd of Greenock built Clan Alpine, launching her on 28 January 1918 and completing her that April.

Clan Alpine was built with a triple-expansion engine that developed 538 NHP. In 1930 a Bauer-Wach exhaust steam turbine was added, which increased her fuel efficiency.

Clan Macneils UK official number was 141879. Her code letters were JSTW until 1933–34, when they were superseded by the call sign GQMR.

Career
Clan Line operated cargo liner services between Britain, India, South Africa and East Africa, and also Australia and the USA.

In the Second World War Clan Alpine was defensively armed with a 4-inch or 4.7-inch gun on her stern, plus two Bofors 40 mm guns and four machine guns for anti-aircraft cover.

On 19 November 1942, while sailing to Saint Helena, Clan Alpine rescued 154 survivors from two lifeboats from the torpedoed Ellerman Lines troop ship  and took them to Saint Helena.

Loss
On 6 March 1943 Clan Alpine left Liverpool bound for Walvis Bay, Durban, Aden and Port Sudan carrying 11,317 tons of general cargo, including army and naval stores. She sailed in Convoy OS 44, which included 46 merchant ships.

Early on 13 March the  sighted OS 44 in the North Atlantic west of Cape Finisterre. At 0530 hours U-107 fired several torpedoes at the convoy and hit four ships: Clan Alpine, Marcella, Oporto, Sembilangan.

Clan Alpine was damaged and 28 of her lascar crew were killed. She did not sink, but it was not practical to repair her or tow her to safety so her surviving crew abandoned her. The escorting sloop  rescued the survivors and scuttled Clan Alpine with depth charges. Scarborough transferred the survivors to the merchant steamship Pendeen, which took them to Gibraltar.

References

Bibliography

External links

1918 ships
Maritime incidents in March 1943
Ships of the Clan Line
Ships sunk by German submarines in World War II
Steamships of the United Kingdom
Ships built on the River Clyde
World War II merchant ships of the United Kingdom
World War II shipwrecks in the Atlantic Ocean